Aljur Mikael Guiang Abrenica (born March 24, 1990) is a Filipino actor, dancer, model and singer. He appeared on the fourth season of StarStruck.

Early and personal life
His father, Alfonso Abrenica Jr., was a musician, and his mother, Amor Guiang, was a member of a band. Abrenica attended Don Bosco Academy, Pampanga in high school and has said that he aspired to become a pilot by pursuing aeronautics.

Abrenica is the older brother of Vin Abrenica. Abrenica became engaged to actress Kylie Padilla by late January 2017, with whom he has child, a son, born on August 4, 2017. The two dated from 2011 to 2014. They dated again in September 2016, but separated in 2021 due to a third party of Aljur according to Kylie’s father Robin Padilla.
Abrenica is a practicing Born-again Christian.

Career
In 2006, he joined reality-based talent search show, StarStruck, and won the "Ultimate Hunk" title. As of September 2007, Abrenica was signed with Regal Films.  Abrenica played Cervano/Zaido in Zaido: Pulis Pangkalawakan. He has also appeared in Dyesebel and Boys Nxt Door, Luna Mystica and SOP Rules. He is also named the "Next Big Male Star" by Yes! Magazine.

Throughout his career in GMA, he was part of the lead cast of All My Life, The Last Prince and Machete, among others. He also starred in the film Nandito Ako...Nagmamahal Sa'Yo, produced by Regal Films. Abrenica joined in a GMA Christmas Reality show, Puso Ng Pasko: Artista Challenge.

In July 2014, Abrenica filed for a petition before the court to be released from GMA Network, stating that the direction of his career does not align with original plans. Despite this, he was still given lead roles in Kambal Sirena and Once Again. He was let go of his home network when his contract expired in March 2017. His last appearances were off-contract guest roles on shows like Bubble Gang.

In August 2017, Abrenica signed an exclusive contract with ABS-CBN. He got his first lead role in the network with Asintado.

Filmography

Television drama series

Drama anthology

Variety and reality shows

Films

Discography

Studio albums

Awards and nominations

References

External links 

 

1990 births
Living people
Participants in Philippine reality television series
Reality show winners
Filipino male television actors
Filipino television variety show hosts
21st-century Filipino male singers
Filipino male models
Filipino Christians
Filipino evangelicals
GMA Network personalities
Star Magic personalities
ABS-CBN personalities
Kapampangan people
People from Angeles City
Male actors from Pampanga
StarStruck (Philippine TV series) participants
21st-century Filipino male actors
StarStruck (Philippine TV series) winners
GMA Music artists
Star Music artists
Filipino male film actors